Gustave Benjamin Boyer (November 29, 1871 – December 2, 1927) was a Canadian journalist and politician.

Born in Saint-Laurent, Quebec, the son of Benjamin Boyer and Angeline Latour, Boyer educated at the College of St. Laurent. He was official lecturer on agriculture in the Province of Quebec and contributed  on agricultural questions for the La Patrie and Le Canada. He was first elected to the House of Commons of Canada for the electoral district of Vaudreuil in the general elections of 1904. A Liberal, he was re-elected in 1908, 1911, 1917, and 1921. In 1922, he was called to the Senate of Canada representing the senatorial division of Rigaud, Quebec on the advice of Prime Minister Mackenzie King. He served until his death in 1927. He was also mayor of Rigaud, Quebec in 1907, 1913–1916, and 1918–1919.

References
 
 The Canadian Parliament; biographical sketches and photo-engravures of the senators and members of the House of Commons of Canada. Being the tenth Parliament, elected November 3, 1904

1871 births
1927 deaths
Canadian senators from Quebec
Liberal Party of Canada MPs
Liberal Party of Canada senators
Mayors of places in Quebec
Members of the House of Commons of Canada from Quebec